"Happy Days" is a 1936 animated short film directed by Ub Iwerks and part of the ComiColor cartoon series.

The film was the last in the ComiColor and intended as a pilot for a series that Iwerks wanted to animate, based on Gene Byrnes's strip Reg'lar Fellers. The series was scheduled for the 1936–1937 season, but never materialized.

References 

1936 animated films
1936 short films
American animated short films
1930s American animated films
Films directed by Ub Iwerks
ComiColor cartoons